Mizz Beats (real name: Iman Yanee) is a record producer and DJ from London. She has collaborated with Skepta, Dizzee Rascal and Roots Manuva, D Smoke, Sir (singer), Tiffany Gouché, Terrace Martin

Discography

Singles and EPs
 "Purple Love"/"Test" collaboration with Silkie (Deep Medi Musik, 2009)
 "My World"/"The Jester" (Deep Medi Musik, 2010)
 Are We the Dictators? EP (Eglo Records, 2011)
 Pimpin white label EP (Eglo Records, 2011)

Appearances
 "Blue Night" from the DJ/rupture and Matt Shadetek mix Solar Life Raft (theAgriculture, 2009)

Production credits
"Signal" by D Double E (2004)
"Colossal Insight" (Jammer & Mizz Beats Remix) by Roots Manuva (Big Dada, 2004)
"Saw It Coming" by Wiley feat. Jammer, JME, Ears & Syer (679 Recordings / Boy Better Know, 2005)
"Hoodie" (Mizz Beats Remix feat. Skepta, JME, Jammer, Ears & Baby Blue) by Lady Sovereign (Island Records / Chocolate Industries, 2005)
"Dean" by Dizzee Rascal (XL Recordings, 2007)
"R U Listning?" by Ears (Jahmektheworld, 2007)
"Purple Love" by Silkie & Mizz Beats (Deep Medi, 2009)
"Riot!" by D Smoke & SiR - Rebel (Woodworks, 2012)
"Up & Down" by Fat Ron & SiR - 80 Dollars (Woodworks, 2014)
"LL Cool Whip" by D Smoke - (Woodworks, 2014)
"Boozhie" by D Smoke feat. Sha'Lea Nikole & Fat Ron (Woodworks, 2014)
"149" by DELS (Big Dada, 2014)
"Honey Jack" by D Smoke feat. Terrace Martin - Inglewood High (Woodworks, 2019)

References

English record producers
Living people
English women in electronic music
British hip hop record producers
British women record producers
Year of birth missing (living people)
Women hip hop record producers
Black British DJs
English women DJs
DJs from London